Pine Tree is second full-length Korean studio album by Kangta, released in 2002.

Track listing
 햇살 (Spring)
 Happy Happy
 사랑은 기억보다 (Memories #1)
 Propose
 바다 (Summer)
 고백 (Confession)
 The Best
 노을 (Autumn)
 추억은 기억보다 (Memories #2)
 Flower
 2032 In Cuba
 눈 (Winter)
 야상곡 (Nocturne)
 이별 후에는 (One Snowing Day)
 상록수 (Pine Tree)

External links
 Kangta's official website
 SM Entertainment's official website

2002 albums
Kangta albums
SM Entertainment albums